The 2016 Challenger ATP Cachantún Cup was a professional tennis tournament played on red clay courts. It was the 9th edition of the tournament which was part of the 2016 ATP Challenger Tour. It took place in Santiago, Chile between 7 and 13 March 2016.

Singles main-draw entrants

Seeds

 1 Rankings are as of February 29, 2016

Other entrants
The following players received wildcards into the singles main draw:
  Gonzalo Achondo
  Marcelo Tomás Barrios Vera
  Cristian Garín
  Thiago Monteiro

The following players received entry from the qualifying draw:
  Federico Coria
  Maximiliano Estévez
  Adrien Puget
  Pedro Sakamoto

The following player received entry as a lucky loser:
  Guillermo Rivera Aránguiz

Champions

Singles

  Facundo Bagnis def.  Rogério Dutra Silva, 6–7(3–7), 6–4, 6–3

Doubles

  Julio Peralta /  Hans Podlipnik def.  Facundo Bagnis /  Máximo González, 7–6(7–4), 4–6, [10–5]

References
 Singles Main Draw

External links
Official Website

Challenger ATP Cachantún Cup
Cachantún Cup (ATP)
Cach